This is a list of episodes from the seventh season of Shark Tank.

Episodes

Actor Ashton Kutcher, music manager Troy Carter, and venture investor Chris Sacca appeared as guest sharks this season.

References

External links 
 Official website
 

7
2015 American television seasons
2016 American television seasons